Sydney Scorpions Futsal Club is an Australian Futsal club based in Sydney, NSW. They play in the F-League which is the top tier of Australian Futsal. The club was founded by Jamie Amendolia and futsalroo Peter Spathis in 2013.

Notable players
 Aaron Cimitle (Futsalroos representative)
 Roberto Maiorana (Futsalroos representative)
 Peter Spathis (Futsalroos representative)
 Chris Zeballos (Futsalroos representative)

References

External links

Futsal clubs in Australia
Futsal clubs established in 2013
2013 establishments in Australia
Sporting clubs in Sydney